Yoan Audrin (born 14 August 1981) is a French rugby union player. His position is centre or wing and he currently plays for Montpellier Hérault in the Top 14. He began his career with Béziers before moving to Bayonne in 2006, then had spells with Montauban and Castres before moving to Montpellier in 2011.

References

1981 births
Living people
French rugby union players
People from Pézenas
Montpellier Hérault Rugby players
Rugby union centres
Rugby union wings
Sportspeople from Hérault
AS Béziers Hérault players
US Montauban players
Castres Olympique players
Aviron Bayonnais players
Racing 92 players